The 1979 E3 Harelbeke was the 22nd edition of the E3 Harelbeke cycle race and was held on 24 March 1979. The race started and finished in Harelbeke. The race was won by Jan Raas of the TI–Raleigh team.

General classification

References

1979 in Belgian sport
1979